Al-Mu'tamid Muhammad ibn Abbad al-Lakhmi  (reigned c. 1069–1091, lived 1040–1095), also known as Abbad III, was the third and last ruler of the Taifa of Seville in Al-Andalus, as well as a renowned poet. He was the final ruler of the Abbadid dynasty of Seville, being overthrown by the Almoravids in 1091.

Early life 
When he was 13 years old, Al-Mu'tamid's father bestowed on him the title of Emir and appointed the Andalusi Arabic poet Ibn Ammar as his vizier. However, Al-Mu'tamid fell strongly under the influence of Ibn Ammar. Al-Mu’tamid's father was wary of Ibn Ammar and the influence he had, ultimately sending him into exile.

Reign 
After the death of his father Abbad II al-Mu'tadid in 1069, Al-Mu'tamid inherited Seville as caliph. One of his first acts was to recall Ibn Ammar and to bestow military honours and high political offices on him, including as Governor of Silves and Prime Minister of the government in Seville. This reconciliation would later be rebuked for unknown reasons.

More likely the cause of resentment grew from the fact that the Prime Minister had let al-Mu'tamid's son, Prince al-Rasid, be captured and held hostage during a military campaign. He had also declared himself Emir of Murcia without properly acknowledging the rights of his own sovereign. The two men exchanged verses full of bitter criticisms and accusations. Murcia was subsequently lost and Ibn Ammar himself taken hostage. A final attempt to conspire with the young prince against his father proved too much for al-Mu'tamid, who "fell into a rage and hacked him to death with his own hands". After Ibn Ammar's death, the caliph was reported to have grieved bitterly and gave his former friend a sumptuous funeral.

Large parts of al-Andalus were under the dominion of al-Mu'tamid: to the west his territory encompassed the land between the lower Guadalquivir and Guadiana, plus the areas around Niebla, Huelva and Saltes. In the south it extended to Morón, Arcos, Ronda, and also Algeciras and Tarifa. The capital, Córdoba, was taken in 1070, lost in 1075, and regained in 1078.

Nevertheless, the family was still subject to taxation by the King of Castile, to whom they were vassals. The drain of these taxes effectively weakened the kingdom's power: al-Mu'tamid's decision to stop paying these taxes caused King Alfonso VI of Castile (who had already conquered Toledo in 1085) to besiege Seville. Al-Mu'tamid asked help from the Berber Almoravids of Morocco against the Castilian king. Al-Mu'tamid supported the Almoravid ruler Yusuf ibn Tashfin against Alfonso in the Battle of Sagrajas in 1086. The Moroccans established themselves at Algeciras and, after defeating the Christians, occupied all the Islamic taifas, including Seville itself in 1091. After they ravaged the city, al-Mu'tamid ordered his sons to surrender the royal fortress (the early Alcázar of Seville) in order to save their lives. When his son, Rashid, had advised him not to call on Yusuf ibn Tashfin, Al-Mu'tamid had rebuffed him:

In 1091, Al-Mu'tamid was taken into captivity by the Almoravids and exiled to Aghmat, Morocco, where he died (or was perhaps assassinated) in 1095. His grave is located in the outskirts of Aghmat.

Legacy 

Al-Mu'tamid, one of the most eminent men of 11th-century al-Andalus, was highly regarded as a writer of poetry in Arabic. He was the father-in-law or father of Zaida of Seville, a concubine of Alfonso VI of Castile, possibly identical to his later wife, Queen Isabella. Iberian Muslim sources say that Zaida of Seville was the wife of Al-Mu'tamid's son Abu Nasr al-Fath al-Ma'mūn, Emir of the Taifa of Córdoba.  Bishop Pelayo of Oviedo asserted that Zaida was the daughter of Abenath (Al-Mu'tamid ibn Abbad), a claim repeated by later Iberian Christian chroniclers that persisted in written histories for hundreds of years.  However, the Islamic chroniclers are considered more reliable, and the general consensus among scholars now is that Zaida was Al-Mu'tamid's daughter-in-law.

See also
 Abbadid dynasty 
 Buthaina bint al-Mu'tamid ibn Abbad

References

Sources

External links

Al-Mu'tamid ibn Abbad: Poems
The Poet King of Seville

The poem of Al-Mu'tamid, in English

1060s births
1095 deaths
Abbadid dynasty
11th-century Arabic poets
11th-century writers from al-Andalus
Poets from al-Andalus
11th-century rulers in Al-Andalus
11th-century Arabs